Lã Đường (927–968) or Lữ Đường, was a warlord of Vietnam during the Period of the 12 Warlords. 

He occupied Tế Giang (mordern Văn Giang District, Hưng Yên Province), and titled himself Lã Tá Công (呂佐公). Later, he was defeated by Đinh Bộ Lĩnh.

References

927 births
968 deaths
10th-century Vietnamese people
People from Hưng Yên Province
Anarchy of the 12 Warlords